Manor Royal is an industrial zone within the town of Crawley in West Sussex, England.  Manor Royal is in the north of the town near to Gatwick Airport. The area is devoted to light industry and offices and was designed for industry as part of the Crawley new town project. Manor Royal was officially named and opened by Princess Elizabeth (later Queen Elizabeth II) on 25 January 1950.

It is bordered by Northgate and Three Bridges to the south, Langley Green to the west, Gatwick to the north and the London - Brighton railway to the east. The area falls largely within the local government ward of Northgate.

Major companies with offices and factories in Manor Royal include:

 ABB
 Amey
 B&CE
 Boeing Flight Services
 British Airways Holidays
 BOC Edwards
 Camelot Chilled Foods
 CGG
 Doosan Power Systems
 Elekta
 G4S
 Grant Thornton
 Invensys APV / Invensys Foxboro
 Jeppesen
 L3 Commercial Training Solutions
 Metrobus
 National Federation of Builders
 Oxford Aviation Academy
 Suzuki GB
 Thales
 TUI Travel
 Unilever
 Varian Medical Systems
 Vent-Axia
 Virgin Atlantic

Manor Royal is served by the Crawley Fastway 24-hour bus service, providing regular services to Gatwick Airport, Crawley and Three Bridges stations, as well as many other local areas.

References

Areas of Crawley